The Minor Party, or Amosites, was a Christian group in Bohemia that split from the Unity of the Brethren during the late 1490s. Its members saw themselves as adhering to the original beliefs of the Unity.

The Minor Party was persecuted and ceased to exist in the mid-16th century.

Unity of the Brethren
Today's Unity of the Brethren has very different beliefs far from when it was founded. Its original doctrines can be found in the early accounts of the book compilation Net of Faith. The book records all the important doctrinal advancements the Unity of the Brethren had during its formative years.

In 1490, the Edict of Brandýs allowed community members to hold public office and opened the door to further reforms of the social policy of the Unity of the Brethren. Furthermore, many of them made alliances with the Hussites and, in the long run, resulted in the formation of what is now known as the Moravians. It changed a lot of their doctrines to lessen the persecution that it experienced from the Catholic and the Protestant churches.

Minor and Major Parties
However, a few of them believed that these reforms were invalid. They stood up for the original doctrines and later they became known as the Minor Party separating themselves from the Major Party, those who accepted the reforms. The Minor Party believed that they were the only ones who followed the Net of Faith.

Beliefs
They believed that the term "minister" must not be limited to those who finished a course on theology or ministry or to those ordained by the clergy but that all Christians must be considered ministers.

They avoided holding any public offices and did not participate in politics and the military.

They preached God's word from house to house, but that was less severely observed during their times because of persecution.

They believed that images should not be used in worship.

They did not believe in Purgatory.

They considered Bible as the only basis of faith.

The Major Party used the Tetragrammaton, the Hebrew name of God, usually translated as Jehovah or Yahweh in English, in its publications.

The Minor Party, oppressed by the persecution from other churches and the Major Party, eventually came to dissolution after their last leaders were executed by their persecutors  Some of them were absorbed into the rising Anabaptist movement.

References

External links
The Net of Faith - A partial English translation
The Birth, Life, and Death of the Bohemian Revival – Historical overview of the Bohemian revival, covering about two centuries

History of Bohemia
Christian denominations founded in Europe
Unity of the Brethren
Religious organizations established in the 1490s
Religious organizations disestablished in the 16th century